Manamadurai taluk is a taluk of Sivagangai district of the Indian state of Tamil Nadu. The headquarters of the taluk is the city of Manamadurai

Demographics
According to the 2011 census, the taluk of Manamadurai had a population of 247,268 with 124,447  males and 122,821 females. There were 984 women for every 1000 men. The taluk had a literacy rate of 71.09. Child population in the age group below 6 was 10,734 Males and 10,399 Females.

References 

Taluks of Sivaganga district